Blumenthal is a surname of German origin, meaning: "flower valley" in German. It can be found among people of German and Jewish origin.

People with the surname
 Albert H. Blumenthal (1928–1984), New York politician
 Alfred Cleveland Blumenthal (1885–1957), American theatrical producer and real estate developer
 Antje Blumenthal (born 1947), German politician
 Bartolomé Blumenthal (1511–1585), supposedly the first German to arrive in Chile
 Casimir von Blumenthal (1787–1849), Belgian violinist and conductor who worked in Switzerland
 Daniel Blumenthal (1860–1930), French politician
 Daniel Blumenthal (born 1952), German-born American pianist
 Ferdinand Blumenthal (1847–1914), American-French entrepreneur and art collector, builder of Hôtel Blumenthal-Montmorency in Paris 
 Florence Meyer Blumenthal, (1875–1930) American philanthropist, underwrote the Prix Blumenthal
 Georg von Blumenthal (1490–1550), German Prince-Bishop and Bishop
 George Blumenthal (banker) (1858–1941) German-born banker
 George R. Blumenthal (born 1945), American astrophysicist, astronomer, professor, and academic administrator
 Hans-Jürgen von Blumenthal (1907–1944), German aristocrat and army officer
 Herman A. Blumenthal (1916–1986), American art director and production designer for films
 Hermann Blumenthal (1905–1942), German sculptor and posthum participating in the documenta 1
 Heston Blumenthal (born 1966), British chef and owner of The Fat Duck restaurant
 Howard Blumenthal, American television and media producer, author, educator, and executive
 Jacques Blumenthal (1829–1908), German pianist and composer
 Joachim Friedrich von Blumenthal (1609–1657), German nobleman, diplomat, founder of the early Brandenburg-Prussian Army
 Joseph Blumenthal, main character in the novel The Hope by Herman Wouk
 Joseph Blumenthal (1897–1990), American printer and typographer
 Joseph von Blumenthal (1782–1856), Belgian violinist and composer
 Josip Mikoczy-Blumenthal (1734–1800), Croatian historian
 Karen Blumenthal (1959–2020), American business journalist and educator
 Leonard Blumenthal (1901–1986), American mathematician
 Leonhard Graf von Blumenthal (1810–1900), Prussian field marshal
 Morton J. Blumenthal (1931-2022), American lawyer and politician
 Mark Blumenthal (1831–1921), German-American physician
 Max Blumenthal (born 1977), American journalist 
 Naomi Blumenthal (born 1943), former Israeli politician
 Naftali Blumenthal (born 1922), former Israeli politician
 Nathan Blumenthal (born 1930), birth name of Nathaniel Branden, Canadian psychotherapist and writer
 Oscar Blumenthal (1852–1917), German writer, critic, and chess player
 Otto Blumenthal (1876–1944), German mathematician
 Richard Blumenthal (born 1946), Democratic U. S. Senator from the state of Connecticut, elected 2010
 Robert Blumenthal, American microbiologist
 Robert McCallum Blumenthal (1931–2012), mathematician, known for Blumenthal's zero–one law
 Roy Blumenthal (born 1968), South African poet
 Sidney Blumenthal (born 1948), American journalist; advisor to Bill and Hillary Clinton
 Vera von Blumenthal (fl. 1918), contributed to the development of the Pueblo Indian pottery
 W. Michael Blumenthal (born 1926), U.S. business executive and Treasury Secretary
 Wolfgang Charles Werner von Blumenthal (1918–2009), birth name of Charles Arnold-Baker, OBE, English barrister, academic and historian.

See also 
 Felicja Blumental (1908–1991), a Polish born pianist and composer

References

Other
von Blumenthal family

German-language surnames
Jewish surnames
Surnames from ornamental names